James H. Brown may refer to:

James Brown (ecologist) (born 1942), American biologist and academic
James H. Brown (judge) (1818–1900), Justice of the Supreme Court of Appeals of West Virginia
James Harmon Brown, American television writer with Barbara Esensten
James Brown (sailor) (1826–1905), American sailor who fought in the American Civil War
James Harvey Brown (1906–1995), city council member in Los Angeles, California